Hugo Mauricio Sarmiento Paz (born 25 April 1978) in  Honduras is a retired footballer who plays as an attacking midfielder. He last played for Vista Hermosa in El Salvador.

External links
http://futbol.univision.com/centroamerica/el-salvador/article/2012-01-24/vista-hermosa-llego-a-un#axzz1kuc4Qras
http://www.zerozero.pt/jogador.php?id=242589&epoca_id=0

1978 births
Living people
People from San Pedro Sula
Association football midfielders
Honduran footballers
A.D. Isidro Metapán footballers
Atlético Balboa footballers
C.D. Vista Hermosa footballers
Expatriate footballers in El Salvador